Sir William Jenner, 1st Baronet, GCB, QHP, FRCP, FRS (30 January 181511 December 1898) was a significant English physician primarily known for having discovered the distinction between typhus and typhoid.

Biography
Jenner was born at Chatham on 30 January 1815, and educated at University College London. He became a Member of the Royal College of Surgeons of England (M.R.C.S.) in 1837, a Fellow of the Royal College of Physicians (F.R.C.P.) in 1852, and in 1844 took the London M.D.

In 1847 he began at the London Fever Hospital investigations into cases of continued fever which enabled him finally to make the distinction between typhus and typhoid on which his reputation as a pathologist principally rests, publishing his book "On the Identity or Non-Identity of Typhoid and Typhus Fever" in 1850. In 1849 he was appointed professor of pathological anatomy at University College, and also assistant physician to University College Hospital, where he afterwards became physician (1854–1876) and consulting physician (1879), besides holding similar appointments at other hospitals. He was also successively Holme Professor of Clinical Medicine and professor of the principles and practice of medicine at University College London.

He was elected President of the Epidemiological Society in 1866–1868, of the Pathological Society in 1873–1875 and of the Clinical Society in 1875. He was president of the Royal College of Physicians from 1881 to 1888 where he had delivered the Goulstonian Lectures in 1853. He was elected a Fellow of the Royal Society (F.R.S.) in 1864 and received honorary degrees from the University of Oxford, University of Cambridge, and University of Edinburgh. In 1861 he was appointed Physician Extraordinary (Q.H.P.), and in 1862 Physician in Ordinary, to Queen Victoria, and in 1863 Physician in Ordinary to the Prince of Wales; he attended both the prince consort and the prince of Wales in their attacks of typhoid fever. In 1868 he was created a baronet.

As a consultant, Sir William Jenner had a great reputation, and he left a large fortune when he died, at Bishops Waltham, Hants, on 11 December 1898, having then retired from practice for eight years owing to failing health. He had married in 1858 Adela Lucy Leman, the daughter of Stephen Adey, with whom he had five sons and a daughter. His son, Leopold, was a decorated Army officer of the First World War.

References

1815 births
1898 deaths
People from Chatham, Kent
Baronets in the Baronetage of the United Kingdom
19th-century English medical doctors
Alumni of University College London
Academics of University College London
Fellows of the Royal College of Physicians
Knights Grand Cross of the Order of the Bath
Presidents of the Royal College of Physicians
Fellows of the Royal Society
Physicians-in-Ordinary
Typhoid fever